Michael Florian Hadschieff (born 5 October 1963) is a former speed skater from Austria.

Biography
At the 1988 Winter Olympics in Calgary, Michael Hadschieff participated in all five distances (500 m - 1,000 m - 1,500 m - 5,000 m - 10,000 m), winning medals in two of those. This performance earned him the first place in the Adelskalender, the all-time allround speed skating ranking, taking over first place from Nikolay Gulyayev. Only three days later, he lost this first place to Eric Flaim.

Hadschieff won two World Cups: On the 1,500 m in 1986 and on the 1,000 m in 1989. His second win was a first place shared with Eric Flaim. Other notable results include winning silver at the European Allround Championships and bronze at the World Allround Championships, both in 1987.

Hadschieff was awarded the Austrian Sportler des Jahres ("Sportsman of the Year") title in 1986.

Personal records 

Hadschieff has an Adelskalender score of 157.884 points. His highest ranking on the Adelskalender was a first place.

References

 Eng, Trond. All Time International Championships, Complete Results: 1889 - 2002. Askim, Norway: WSSSA-Skøytenytt, 2002.
 Teigen, Magne. Komplette Resultater Internasjonale Mesterskap 1889 - 1989: Menn/Kvinner, Senior/Junior, allround/sprint. Veggli, Norway: WSSSA-Skøytenytt, 1989.

External links
Michael Hadschieff at SkateResults.com
Short bio on Michael Hadschieff from the Encyclopedia of Austria
Personal records from The Skatebase

1963 births
Living people
Austrian male speed skaters
Olympic speed skaters of Austria
Speed skaters at the 1984 Winter Olympics
Speed skaters at the 1988 Winter Olympics
Speed skaters at the 1992 Winter Olympics
Speed skaters at the 1994 Winter Olympics
Olympic silver medalists for Austria
Olympic bronze medalists for Austria
Sportspeople from Innsbruck
Olympic medalists in speed skating
Medalists at the 1988 Winter Olympics
Universiade medalists in speed skating
World Allround Speed Skating Championships medalists
Universiade gold medalists for Austria
Competitors at the 1991 Winter Universiade